Fedele Fischetti (30 March 1732 – 25 January 1792) was an Italian painter of the Neoclassical period. He was born and died in Naples the capital of the Kingdom of Naples.

Biography
F. Fischetti was mainly active as a fresco painter for palaces and villas in and around the city, including the Royal Palace at Portici.
He painted frescoes of the seasons, Summer and Winter, in the conversation rooms of the appartamento vecchio of the Royal Palace of Caserta.

He was active all over Naples area between the 1750 ca until his last year of life.

Among his works are listed:
Virgin, St Anne, with Saints Carlo and Geronimo in the Chapel of the Assumption in the church of Spirito Santo 
Three oil canvases in the Chapel of the Verdi in the church of Spirito Santo 
Virgin of the Rosary with Santa Rosa for the Chapel of the Prince della Roccella in the Church of San Domenico Maggiore
Canvases in Santa Caterina da Siena, San Eligio, and Santa Maria in Portico
Summer with Ceres and Proserpine, Winter with Boreas Abducting Orithyia and for the Queen's quarters, a Venus; all painted for the Palace of Caserta
 Ceilings for the Palazzo Francavilla (Palazzo Cellammare), painted alongside Pietro Bardellino and Giacinto Diano

Two of his pupils were Paolo Girgenti and Giuseppe Camerata (born in Sciacca) as at least two of his sons: Alessandro and Odoardo.

References

1732 births
1792 deaths
Painters from Naples
18th-century Neapolitan people
18th-century Italian painters
Italian male painters
Italian neoclassical painters
18th-century Italian male artists